Mount Auburn is an unincorporated community in Franklin County, Indiana, in the United States.

History
Mount Auburn was platted in 1850. It is located at latitude 39.508 and longitude -85.194. Mount Auburn's elevation is 906 feet above mean sea level.

References

Unincorporated communities in Franklin County, Indiana
Unincorporated communities in Indiana